Uyyalawada is a village in Uyyalawada mandal, located in Nandyal district of the Indian state of Andhra Pradesh.

Geography
It is situated on the bank of the River Kundu, which is a tributary of the Penna River. It has an average elevation of 216 m  (709 ft).
Kundu start at uyyalawada village.

Demographics
As per 2011 census, Uyyalawada village has population of 4199 of which 2123 are males while 2076 are females. There are 1042 households in the village.

References

Villages in Nandyal  district